Balbina Bäbler (Glarus, 7 May 1967) is a Swiss archaeologist, specialist on the Northern Black Sea coastal area.

Biography 
Balbina Bäbler studied at the universities of Bern and Munich. She graduated the course in 1997 with a thesis on "Diligent Thracians and strong Scythians: non-Greek population of Athens of the classical period and their archaeological heritage» («Fleissige Thrakerinnen und wehrhafte Skythen Nichtgriechen im klassischen Athen und ihre archaologische Hinterlassenschaft.»).

Bäbler is an expert on the archaeological chronology and burial cultures, and an Honorary Fellow at the University of Exeter. Bäbler worked at the University of Hamburg, Leibniz University Hannover, as well as in the University of Göttingen.

Balbina Bäbler is an author of several articles in the encyclopedia Neue Pauly.

Publications 
 Fleissige Thrakerinnen und wehrhafte Skythen. Nichtgriechen im klassischen Athen und ihre archäologische Hinterlassenschaft, Teubner, Stuttgart-Leipzig 1998 
 Die Welt des Sokrates von Konstantinopel. Studien zu Politik, Religion und Kultur im späten 4. und frühen 5. Jh. n. Chr. (Hrsg. mit Heinz-Günther Nesselrath), Saur, München-Leipzig 2001 
 Archäologie und Chronologie. Eine Einführung, Wissenschaftliche Buchgesellschaft, Darmstadt 2004 (Einführung Archäologie) 
 Ars et Verba. Die Kunstbeschreibungen des Kallistratos. Einführung, Text, Übersetzung, Anmerkungen, archäologischer Kommentar (mit Heinz-Günther Nesselrath), Saur, München-Leipzig 2006

References

1967 births
Swiss archaeologists
Living people
People from Glarus
University of Bern alumni
Ludwig Maximilian University of Munich alumni
Swiss women archaeologists